Zoran Mikulić (born 24 October 1965) is a Croatian former professional handball player.

He played for the Croatia national team at the 1996 Summer Olympics in Atlanta, where Croatia won the gold medal.

Honours
Metaloplastika Šabac
Yugoslav First League (2): 1986–87, 1987–88

BM Granollers
EHF Cup (1): 1996

TuS Nettelstedt-Lübbecke
EHF City Cup (2): 1997, 1998

Individual
Franjo Bučar State Award for Sport - 1996

References

External links

1965 births
Living people
Croatian male handball players
Olympic handball players of Croatia
Handball players at the 1996 Summer Olympics
Olympic gold medalists for Croatia
Olympic medalists in handball
Medalists at the 1996 Summer Olympics
BM Granollers players

Croats of Bosnia and Herzegovina 
People from Travnik